The VKT-line or Viipuri–Kuparsaari–Taipale line was a Finnish defensive line on Karelian Isthmus during the Continuation War, spanning from Viipuri (Vyborg) through Tali and Kuparsaari along the northern shore of Vuoksi River, Suvanto and Taipaleenjoki to Taipale on the western shore of Lake Ladoga, using natural benefits of the eastern part of the destroyed Mannerheim Line.

See also
VT-line
Karelian Fortified Region
Salpa Line

Continuation War
World War II defensive lines